Reader Gillson Wood (1821 – 20 August 1895) was a 19th-century New Zealand politician. An architect by trade, he designed the 1854 General Assembly House built as New Zealand's first meeting house for the House of Representatives.

Early life
Wood, the son of Thomas and Sarah Wood, was baptised at the Church of St Mary de Castro, Leicester, Leicestershire, England, on 5 January 1821. He was educated at the Merchant Taylors' School, London. He was brought up as an architect, and shortly after his articles had expired left England for New Zealand, arriving in Auckland in 1844.

Life in Auckland
The Battle of Kororāreka happened in the Bay of Islands in March 1845 and there were fears that the fighting would spread to Auckland, which at the time was the capital of New Zealand. Wood was made lieutenant of Volunteer Artillery, and was present at the attempted storming of Hōne Heke's pā at Ohaeawai on 1 July 1845. He was mentioned in Colonel Henry Despard's despatch describing that affair. After the war Wood returned to Auckland, where he practised his profession of architect and surveyor. About 1848 he was employed by the Government as Inspector of Roads, afterwards he was appointed Deputy Surveyor-General, which office he retained until 1856. He was tasked with the design of the General Assembly House, which was built in 1854 in Auckland as New Zealand's first meeting house for the House of Representatives.

Political career

Wood was elected to the Auckland Provincial Council in the Suburbs of Auckland electorate  on 7 October 1857. He served for the duration of the third council until the end of the term on 12 September 1861.

He also had a second term on the provincial council, where he represented the Parnell electorate on the seventh council from 29 November 1873 until the abolition of the provincial government system on 31 October 1876. From May to October 1875, he was part of the Auckland Executive Council (equivalent to a cabinet).

In the House of Representatives, he was a cabinet minister, including the positions of Minister of Finance (then called Colonial Treasurer) twice, and Minister of Defence (then called Minister of Colonial Defence). He was part of the Auckland wing of the Liberal Party, sometimes called the "Auckland Rats".

Private life and death
On 20 May 1850, he married Mary Jane Holland at St Paul's Church, Auckland's oldest Anglican church. He died at his home in Parnell, Auckland, on 20 August 1895, leaving his widow and one son, and was buried at St Stephen's Cemetery, Parnell. He was survived by one son and his wife, who died in 1898 and is buried in the same grave.

Notes

References

|-

1821 births
1895 deaths
People from Leicester
English emigrants to New Zealand
Members of the Auckland Provincial Council
Members of the Cabinet of New Zealand
Members of the New Zealand House of Representatives
New Zealand defence ministers
New Zealand finance ministers
New Zealand Liberal Party MPs
New Zealand public servants
New Zealand MPs for Auckland electorates
Unsuccessful candidates in the 1887 New Zealand general election
Burials at St Stephen's Cemetery, Parnell
19th-century New Zealand architects
Members of Auckland provincial executive councils
19th-century New Zealand politicians
People educated at Merchant Taylors' School, Northwood